The Song of the Nations (German: Das Lied der Nationen) is a 1931 German musical film directed by Rudolf Meinert and starring Camilla Horn, Igo Sym and Betty Amann. A separate French-language version La chanson des nations was also produced.

Cast
Camilla Horn
Igo Sym
Betty Amann
Erna Morena
Weiß Ferdl
Jack Trevor
Charles Willy Kayser
Ernst Reicher
Rudolf Meinert

References

External links

1931 films
1931 musical films
German musical films
Films of the Weimar Republic
1930s German-language films
Films directed by Rudolf Meinert
German multilingual films
German black-and-white films
1931 multilingual films
1930s German films